Stephanie Johnson Rowley is a developmental psychologist and academic administrator known for her work on racial identity and parental socialization of race and ethnicity. She is the dean of University of Virginia's Curry School of Education.

Rowley was previously the provost, dean, and vice president for academic affairs, and a professor of psychology and education at Teachers College, Columbia University. She is a member of the Governing Council of the Society for Research in Child Development.

Biography 
Rowley attended the University of Michigan, where she received her B.A degree in Honors Psychology and African American Studies in 1992. She later attended the University of Virginia (UVA), where she obtained her M.A in 1995 and Ph.D. in 1997 in Developmental Psychology. Her dissertation was titled "Racial identity, school engagement, and educational utility in African-American high school students." While at the University of Virginia, Rowley was supported by a Ford Foundation Fellowship and was a Carter G. Woodson Predoctoral Fellow. Her mentor was Robert M. Sellers.

After graduating, she was hired as an Assistant Professor of Psychology at the University of North Carolina at Chapel Hill. In 2000, she moved to the Department of Psychology at the University of Michigan where she was affiliated with the Center for Human Growth and Development. At Michigan, Rowley received the Rackham Distinguished Graduate Mentor Award in 2015 and the Cornerstone Award in 2018 in recognition of her efforts in supporting the academic and social development of African-American students. Rowley served as Associate Chair in the Department of Psychology, Chair of the Combined Program in Education and Psychology, and Associate Vice President for Research at the University of Michigan before moving to Teachers College, Columbia University in 2019.

Rowley has received grant support for her research from the National Science Foundation.

In September 2022, Rowley was appointed dean of the UVA Curry School of Education.

Research 
Rowley's research program focuses on development of children's racial and gender identities and their attitudes and beliefs about race and gender. Her interdisciplinary field of study encompasses developmental psychology, Black studies, and education. She has participated in multiple high impact studies which led to the development of a multidimensional model of racial identity. This model examines racial identity in two distinct ways, by exploring universal properties associated with ethnic and racial identities and documenting the qualitative meaning of being African American. Some key findings from this model are four dimensions of African American racial identity: salience, centrality, regard, and ideology. Rowley has also contributed to research aimed at understanding parental influences on children's school-related development in the early years, gender stereotypes about mathematics and science, and children's self-perceptions of ability in late childhood and early adolescence. One key finding from this research is that when boys believe that adults hold more traditional stereotypes, they correspondingly tend to hold beliefs that girls are relatively less capable or that boys are more capable in mathematics and science. These results provide support for social status and experiential theories of development.

Representative publications 

 Rowley, S. J. (2000). Profiles of African American college students’ educational utility and performance: A cluster analysis. Journal of Black Psychology, 26(1), 3-26. 
Rowley, S. J., Burchinal, M. R., Roberts, J. E., & Zeisel, S. A. (2008). Racial identity, social context, and race-related social cognition in African Americans during middle childhood. Developmental Psychology, 44(6), 1537–1546.
Rowley, S. J., Kurtz‐Costes, B., Mistry, R., & Feagans, L. (2007). Social status as a predictor of race and gender stereotypes in late childhood and early adolescence. Social Development, 16(1), 150–168.
Rowley, S. J., Sellers, R. M., Chavous, T. M., & Smith, M. A. (1998). The relationship between racial identity and self-esteem in African American college and high school students. Journal of Personality and Social Psychology, 74(3), 715–724.
Sellers, R. M., Rowley, S. A., Chavous, T. M., Shelton, J. N., & Smith, M. A. (1997). Multidimensional Inventory of Black Identity: A preliminary investigation of reliability and construct validity. Journal of Personality and Social Psychology, 73(4), 805–815.
 Taylor, L. C., Clayton, J. D., & Rowley, S. J. (2004). Academic socialization: Understanding parental influences on children's school-related development in the early years. Review of General Psychology , 8 (3), 163–178.

References

Living people
United States National Science Foundation officials
Ford Foundation fellowships
University of Michigan alumni
University of Virginia alumni
Teachers College, Columbia University faculty
Columbia University faculty
African-American psychologists
American developmental psychologists
American women psychologists
21st-century American psychologists
Year of birth missing (living people)
21st-century American women scientists
21st-century African-American scientists
African-American women scientists
African-American women academic administrators
African-American academic administrators
Women deans (academic)
Education school deans
American university and college faculty deans